Oostburg (Zeelandic Flemish: Wòstburg) is a city in the south-western Netherlands. It located in the municipality of Sluis, in the province of Zeeland. As of 1 January 2015, its population is 4731, down from 5008 in January 2005. It received city rights in 1237. Before 1 January 2003, Oostburg was also the name of a municipality. It merged with Sluis-Aardenburg to form the new municipality of Sluis. The municipality covered an area of 224.93 km², of which 1.05 km² was water. As well as the town of Oostburg, the former municipality also included the following towns, villages and townships:
Breskens
Cadzand
Groede
Hoofdplaat
IJzendijke
Nieuwvliet
Schoondijke
Waterlandkerkje
Zuidzande

Oostburg is typically a tourist town very close to the beaches at Cadzand. Every Wednesday is market day all year round but in the summer the city is busy and has many fun events.

The unicorn
Oostburg's symbol is the unicorn, from which the townsfolk are said to derive strength and courage. In reality, the unicorn's presence is represented by a sculpture produced by the sculptress Liesbeth Messer-Heijbroek who for many years, with her husband, lived in the area: she evidently took inspiration from the name of a former inn. The sculpture has been repositioned at least once since it first appeared in 1952 during the postwar reconstruction: at one stage it adorned a small car park. Currently it shares with a modern fountain a spot in "Eenhoornplantsoen" (Unicorn Place) beyond the northern end of the old market square in the town centre.

WW2 Monument
During the Second World War approximately 140 Oostburg townsfolk died and most of all the buildings, shops and churches were destroyed. This monument is a tribute to them and the rebuilding of the town. Around the lower part of the monument are the names of those who perished.

Gallery

References 

Cities in the Netherlands
Municipalities of the Netherlands disestablished in 2003
Populated places in Zeeland
Former municipalities of Zeeland
Sluis